Aerovias Guest S.A. was Mexico's third airline founded after Mexicana de Aviación and Aeronaves de Mexico. It was later taken over by Aeronaves de Mexico when it declared bankruptcy.

History
Aerovias Guest was founded in June 1946. In the 1950s, the airline began an international partnership with Scandinavian Airlines (SAS) after SAS purchased a share of the airline. The airline's name was later changed to Guest Aerovias Mexico. SAS sold its share of the airline in 1961. 

In early 1963, the airline flying as Guest Aerovias Mexico was operating daily nonstop Douglas DC-8 jet service between Mexico City and New York City as well as nonstop DC-8 flights four days a week between Mexico City and Miami and was also flying de Havilland Comet 4C jet service twice a week on Mexico City - Guatemala - Panama City - Caracas and Mexico City - Guatemala - Panama City - Bogota routings.  Aerovias Guest was then taken over by Aeronaves de Mexico later in 1963 and the company name was retired.

Destinations
At different times, Aerovias Guest flew to the following destinations:
Bermuda, United Kingdom
Caracas, Venezuela
Lisbon, Portugal
Madrid, Spain
Mexico City, Mexico (base)
Miami, USA
New York City, USA
Panama City, Panama
Paris, France
Windsor, Canada

Fleet
The fleet of Aerovias Guest consisted of the following aircraft:

2 de Havilland Comet 4C
6 Douglas C-54 Skymaster
4 Douglas DC-6
? Douglas DC-8C
3 Lockheed L-749 Constellation
2 Lockheed L-1049G Constellation

References

External links
http://www.airlinercafe.com/forums.php?m=posts&q=5697
http://www.timetableimages.com/ttimages/ag.htm

Defunct airlines of Mexico
SAS Group
Airlines established in 1946
Airlines disestablished in 1963
Mexican companies established in 1946
1963 disestablishments in Mexico